James Trembath (15 March 1871 – 2 April 1942) was a South African sports shooter. He competed in the 600 m free rifle event at the 1924 Summer Olympics.

References

External links
 

1871 births
1942 deaths
South African male sport shooters
Olympic shooters of South Africa
Shooters at the 1924 Summer Olympics
20th-century South African people